PoraMon is a 2013 Bangladeshi Bengali romantic drama film directed by Zakir Hossain Raju and written by Farzana. It is distributed by Jaaz Multimedia. It stars Symon Sadik and Mahiya Mahi. A stand alone sequel PoraMon 2 was released on 16 June 2018.

Plot

'Sujon' is a reckless boy of 'Sundorpur'. But his father becomes addicted to gambling, which changes his life. He started working as a helper of "Chander Gari". There he meets with 'Pori' and in time they fall in love with each other. But Pori's mother is not happy about this and she fixes Pori's marriage in another place, which makes Sujon unhappy. He becomes furious and destroys Pori's mother's cake shop. Pori's mother tries to kill Sujon with a sharp weapon but the villagers stop her. So Pori's mother complains against Sujon at the nearest police station and they arrest Sujon. The police officer Abid likes him which makes it easy for Sujon to flee from the station. Sujon goes to stop the wedding and escape into the forest with Pori. Abid starts to look for them. But in one situation Sujon rescues Abid from danger and saves Abid's life. So Abid promises to make their marriage happen.

Cast
 Mahiya Mahi as Pori
 Symon as Sujon
 Anisur Rahman Milon as Abid
 Bipasha Kabir as Mukti
 Ali Raj as Sujon's father 
 Monira Mithu as Pori's mother 
 Rehana Jolly
 Sharika as Little Pori
 Prachurjo as Little Sujon
 Misha Sawdagor
 Shiba Shanu
 Jahidul Islam Ratul

Response
Asian TV's Movie Bazaar survey chose Poramon as the "Most Loved Film of Year".

Awards

References

2013 films
2013 romantic drama films
Bengali-language Bangladeshi films
Bangladeshi romantic drama films
Films scored by Ahmed Imtiaz Bulbul
Films scored by Shafiq Tuhin
2010s Bengali-language films
Films directed by Zakir Hossain Raju
Jaaz Multimedia films